Sadat Mahalleh (also Romanized as Sādāt Maḩalleh and Sadat Mahaleh; also known as Said Mahalleh and Seyyed Maḩalleh) is a village in Abali Rural District of Rudehen District, Damavand County, Tehran province, Iran. At the 2006 National Census, its population was 1,396 in 380 households. The following census in 2011 counted 1,410 people in 402 households. The latest census in 2016 showed a population of 1,397 people in 436 households; it was the largest village in its rural district.

References 

Damavand County

Populated places in Tehran Province

Populated places in Damavand County